Ivor Horvat (born 19 August 1991) is a Croatian football right back who plays for Austrian club ASK Köflach.

Club career
On 10 August 2020, he signed with Austrian club SV Horn.

References

External links
 
 Ivor Horvat at Sportnet.hr 
 

1991 births
Living people
Footballers from Zagreb
Association football fullbacks
Croatian footballers
Croatia youth international footballers
Croatia under-21 international footballers
NK Lokomotiva Zagreb players
NK Istra 1961 players
NK Lučko players
FC Koper players
Puskás Akadémia FC players
Csákvári TK players
NK Radomlje players
NK Tabor Sežana players
SV Horn players
HNK Vukovar '91 players
NK Varaždin (2012) players
Croatian Football League players
First Football League (Croatia) players
Slovenian PrvaLiga players
Slovenian Second League players
Nemzeti Bajnokság I players
Nemzeti Bajnokság II players
2. Liga (Austria) players
Austrian Landesliga players
Croatian expatriate footballers
Croatian expatriate sportspeople in Slovenia
Expatriate footballers in Slovenia
Croatian expatriate sportspeople in Hungary
Expatriate footballers in Hungary
Croatian expatriate sportspeople in Austria
Expatriate footballers in Austria